Libertarianism Today is a 2010 book about the modern libertarian movement by Jacob H. Huebert. The work, which received generally positive reviews, has been described as a successor book to Murray Rothbard's For a New Liberty (1973).

Reception
The book has received generally positive reviews from David Gordon, Walter Block, and Stephan Kinsella, among others.

References

2010 non-fiction books
American political books
English-language books
Libertarian books
Libertarianism in the United States